Louis of Borbón-Préaux ( 1368–died October 25, 1415, at the battle of Agincourt) was a French knight, Lord of Préaux.  He was the son of Jacques of Bourbon-Préaux, Lord of Préaux, and Grand Butler of France and Margaret of Préaux.

Life 
Louis took part at the Battle of Agincourt and he was one of the captains that commanded the left-wing of the French army, which was composed by 800 knights. However, he died during the battle. He was childless and he was succeeded by his brother, Peter of Bourbon-Préaux.

References

Bibliography 
 

Medieval French knights
People of the Hundred Years' War
French military personnel killed in action
1368 births
1415 deaths